This is a list of hiking trails in Minnesota. To be included in this list, the trail must be in the U.S. state of Minnesota, and it must be designated for hiking by a primary source or be notable for hiking in credible secondary sources. It is not sufficient for the trail to merely accommodate pedestrian uses like walking or running to be on this list. While this list may include some multi-use trails and paved paths, hiking must be a predominant type of activity for the trail, which deliberately excludes many shared bicycle paths, sidewalks, snowmobile/ATV trails, urban walking areas, and other types of non-automobile paths. Hiking is considered a recreational activity that fits Classes 1-3 of the Yosemite Decimal System.

Trails by region

Central/Metro 
 Bruce Vento
 Cannon Valley
 Coldwater Spring
 Crosby Farm to Hidden Falls trail
 Dakota Rail
 Gateway
 Glacial Lakes
 Luce Line
 Minnehaha Falls Lower Glen Trail
 Minnehaha Trail
 Minnesota Valley
 Rush Creek
 Winchell Trail

Northeast 
 Arrowhead
 Border Route
 Cut Foot Sioux
 Cuyuna Lakes
 Eagle Mountain
 Gitchi-Gami
 Kekekabic
 North Country
 North Shore
 Sioux–Hustler
 Snowbank
 Superior
 Taconite

Northwest 
 Agassiz
 Central Lakes
 Heartland
 Greater Grand Forks
 Paul Bunyan

Southeast 
 Big Rivers
 Douglas
 Goodhue Pioneer
 Great River Ridge
 Mill Towns
 Root River
 Shooting Star

Southwest 
 Casey Jones
 Sakatah Singing Hills

See also 
 Cycling in Minnesota
 List of Minnesota state forests
 List of Minnesota state parks
 List of rail trails in Minnesota
 List of shared-use paths in Minneapolis

External links
 All Trails: Best Trails in Minnesota
 Minnesota Department of Natural Resources: Hiking in Minnesota

Hiking trails in Minnesota
National Recreation Trails in Minnesota
Parks in Minneapolis
Minnesota